Qaleh Barez (also Romanized as Qal‘eh Bārez) is a village in Barez Rural District, Manj District, Lordegan County, Chaharmahal and Bakhtiari Province, Iran. At the 2006 census, its population was 15, in 4 families.

References 

Populated places in Lordegan County